The Concept 40 is an American sailboat, that was designed by Gary Mull and first built in 1981. The design is out of production.

The design was developed into the Kalik 40 and the Ocean 40.

Production
The boat was built by Concept Yachts in the United States, starting in 1981 and also by Hyundai of  Seoul, South Korea.

Design
The Concept 40 is a small recreational keelboat, built predominantly of fiberglass. It has a masthead sloop rig and a fixed wing keel. It displaces  and carries  of iron ballast.

The boat has a PHRF racing handicap of 99.

See also
List of sailing boat types

References

Keelboats
Sailboat type designs by Gary Mull
1980s sailboat type designs
Sailing yachts
Sailboat types built by Concept Yachts
Sailboat types built by Hyundai